Mandé  is a commune in the Cercle of Kati in the Koulikoro Region of south-western Mali. The commune lies to the southwest of Bamako, the Malian capital, along the left bank of the Niger River. It covers for an area of 730 km2 and includes the small town of Ouezzindougou, the administrative centre, and 24 villages. In the 2009 census the commune had a population of 59,352.

References

External links
.

Communes of Koulikoro Region